Abronia zongolica is a species of lizard in the family Anguidae. The species is endemic to Mexico.

Adult males measure  and adult females (based on a single specimen)  in snout–vent length. The tail is up to 1.5 times the snout–vent length.

References

zongolica
Endemic reptiles of Mexico
Reptiles described in 2022